This is the list of film production companies which are operating in Estonia. The list is incomplete.

References 

 
Film-related lists